Aulacophora abdominalis is a species of leaf beetle in the genus Aulacophora.

Distribution
A. abdominalis is widely distributed across the southwestern Pacific, stretching from Timor in the west to Niue in the east. The species has not been recorded from the Australian mainland, but approaches it at 60 km at Moa Island in the Torres Strait Islands.

References

Aulacophora
Beetles described in 1781
Taxa named by Johan Christian Fabricius
Beetles of Asia
Beetles of Oceania